K2L Entertainment is a Brazilian artistic entertainment company, founded by Brazil music mogul Kamilla Fialho. that has known famous singer Anitta, Lexa and Valesca Popozuda.

History
The company started with older artists like Valesca Popozuda and MC Sapão, and among the currently best known to Lexa singer who was one of the best bets of the company.

Recording artists

Groups
 Banda Fuze
 3030

Double
 Bruninho & Davi

Soloists
 Anitta
 Valesca Popozuda
 MC Sapão
 Lexa
 MC Rebecca
 MC Kevin O Chris

References

External links
 
 

 
Organisations based in Rio de Janeiro (city)
Brazilian music industry